Mutiusinazita High School is a high school in Buhera District, Manicaland Province, Zimbabwe.

Mutiusinazita High School was established in 1983, three years after Zimbabwe gained its independence from British colonialism. The school attained High School status in 2002 with Girison Tipi as the headmaster. The very first stream of students passed so well that the school received The Secretary's Bell, a shield of honor for academic performance.

Educational institutions established in 1983
High schools in Zimbabwe
1983 establishments in Zimbabwe
Buhera District
Education in Manicaland Province